Edward Waller may refer to:

 Edward Waller (bishop) (1871–1942), Anglican clergyman
 Edward Waller (zoologist) (1803–1873), Irish zoologist
 Edward C. Waller III (born 1926), admiral in the United States Navy
 Edward Carson Waller (1845–1931), Chicago developer and patron of Frank Lloyd Wright
 Eddy Waller (1889–1977), American film and television actor

See also
 Edward Walker (disambiguation)